Roberto Linares Balmaseda (born February 10, 1986) is a football forward from Cuba playing currently for Argentine side All Boys.

Club career
A powerful and pacy striker, Linares played for his provincial side Villa Clara. He was the Cuban league's top goalscorer in 2012. He joined Argentine side All Boys alongside compatriot José Dairo Macías in summer 2015.

International career
He made his international debut for Cuba in a February 2008 friendly match against Guyana and has earned a total of 42 caps, scoring 14 goals. He represented his country in 12 FIFA World Cup qualification matches (4 goals) and played at the 2011 CONCACAF Gold Cup.

His final international was a December 2012 Caribbean Cup match against Trinidad & Tobago.

International goals

References

External links

1986 births
Living people
People from Remedios, Cuba
Association football forwards
Cuban footballers
Cuba international footballers
2011 CONCACAF Gold Cup players
FC Villa Clara players
Cuban expatriate footballers
Expatriate footballers in Argentina
Cuban expatriate sportspeople in Argentina